Jan Procházka (4 February 1929 – 20 February 1971) was a Czechoslovak writer, screenwriter and producer. He wrote films including Ucho, Fetters, Slasti Otce vlasti and On the Comet. Procházka was also involved in films such as A Report on the Party and the Guests and Diamonds of the Night.

Bibliography
 Ear, Karolinum Press, 2022. .

External links
 

1929 births
People from Ivančice
1971 deaths
Czechoslovak writers
Czechoslovak screenwriters
20th-century Czech writers